Kim de Baat (born 29 May 1991) is a Dutch-born Belgian professional racing cyclist, who currently rides for UCI Women's Continental Team .

She is the daughter of the 1977 Dutch woman road champion Nita van Vliet and niece of former racing cyclist Teun van Vliet.

Major results

2013
 6th Erondegemse Pijl
 8th Tour of Chongming Island World Cup
2014
 5th 7-Dorpenomloop Aalburg
2015
 6th EPZ Omloop van Borsele
 6th Tour of Chongming Island World Cup
 8th Ronde van Gelderland
2022
 1st  Road race, National Road Championships

See also
 2014 Parkhotel Valkenburg Continental Team season

References

External links

1991 births
Living people
Dutch female cyclists
Belgian female cyclists
Cyclists from Rotterdam
21st-century Dutch women
21st-century Belgian women